Trường Sơn may refer to:

Trường Sơn, Sầm Sơn, a ward of Sầm Sơn, Thanh Hóa Province
Trường Sơn, Haiphong, a township of An Lão District, Haiphong
Trường Sơn, Hà Tĩnh, a rural commune of Đức Thọ District
Trường Sơn, Bắc Giang, a rural commune of Lục Nam District
Trường Sơn, Nông Cống, a rural commune of Nông Cống District
Trường Sơn, Quảng Bình, a rural commune of Quảng Ninh District
Dãy Trường Sơn, Vietnamese name for the Annamite Range